The Knight is a fantasy novel written by American author Gene Wolfe. It depicts the journey of an American boy transported to a magical realm and aged to adulthood who soon thereafter becomes a knight. The first of a two-part tale known collectively as The Wizard Knight is told in an epistolary style, and contains elements from Norse, Arthurian, and Christian Mythology. It received a nomination for the Nebula Award in 2005.

Plot summary
The story opens with an older narrator recounting a great adventure. He is left alone in a cabin in the wilderness by himself for a few days. He goes for a hike and ends up chasing a flying castle he sees in the sky until he is abducted by "a lot of people". He awakens to find himself at the mouth of a cave by the sea. He is greeted by a fortune teller who calls him Able of the High Heart and turns his walking stick into a bow. He soon after discovers his chivalrous destiny and embarks on a quest to travel this strange new land.

References

American fantasy novels
2004 American novels
2004 fantasy novels
Tor Books books